Juan Dixon (born October 9, 1978) is an American former professional basketball player and the previous head coach for Coppin State University in Baltimore.  Dixon led the University of Maryland Terrapins to their first NCAA championship in 2002 and earned Most Outstanding Player honors at the 2002 Final Four.

Early life
Dixon was born in Baltimore, Maryland, where he attended Lake Clifton High School as a freshman. He then attended and played basketball at Calvert Hall, a high school in Towson, Maryland. While at Calvert Hall, he scored 1,590 career points under the tutelage of head coach Mark Amatucci.

Both his mother, Juanita, and father, Phil, were heroin addicts, and died of AIDS-related illnesses before Dixon was 17 years old.  He was then raised by his grandparents Roberta and Warnick Graves in Baltimore.

Dixon's aunt, Sheila Dixon, was the mayor of Baltimore.  Dixon's half brother is Jermaine Dixon, who played shooting guard for the University of Pittsburgh Panthers basketball team. His second cousin Brandon Driver played cornerback for the San Jose State Spartans football team.  In 2016, Juan Dixon discovered that Phil Dixon was not his biological father, and that his biological father Bruce Flanigan was still alive.  Flanigan had an affair with Juanita Dixon while she was separated from Phil, and a blood test confirmed his paternity.  Dixon and Flanigan reconnected and became good friends.

Personal life
Dating since 1996, Dixon married his high-school sweetheart, Robyn Bragg, in July 2005. She works in the public relations field and is a cast member in the Bravo reality television show The Real Housewives of Potomac. They have two sons, Corey (b. 2008) and Carter (b. 2010). The two divorced in March 2012 but still lived together in Maryland after their divorce. In January 2023, the couple remarried.

Playing career

College
Dixon arrived at the University of Maryland, College Park after head coach Gary Williams inadvertently discovered him at an AAU tournament in Georgia. Williams watched as Dixon dove for the ball down 20 points with two minutes to go. Williams was impressed by the effort.

Dixon played in 34 games his freshman year and averaged 7.4 points per game. He made improvements in his sophomore year as he averaged 18 points per game and was selected to the 1999–2000 All-ACC team.

Both Dixon and the Terps entered the 2000–01 season with high expectations. The Terps began ranked in the top ten in most major polls while Dixon was a candidate for the Naismith Award Player of the Year award and the Wooden Award Player of the Year award. Dixon helped lead the Terps to their first ever Final Four appearance where the team lost to Duke. Dixon ended the season averaging 18.2 points per game and was again elected to the All-ACC first team.

Maryland began the 2001–02 season ranked #2 in ESPN/USA Today Coaches' Poll. Dixon led the Terps to a 32–4 record and the school's first ever National Championship. He was voted to All-ACC team and was also a first team All-American. He was also recognized as one of the nation's best college players and was honored as the 2002 ACC Men's Basketball Player of the Year and ACC Athlete of the Year.

He became Maryland men's basketball's all-time leading scorer when he scored 29 points against Wisconsin to help Maryland advance to the Sweet Sixteen, passing Len Bias (2,149 points).  He also became the only player in NCAA history to accumulate 2,000 points, 300 steals and 200 three-point field goals. In addition to leaving Maryland as the highest-scoring men's player, Dixon also left as the school's all-time men's leader in three-pointers made (239) and attempted (615).  He is second on Maryland's all-time steals list with 333 and third in free-throw percentage (.850).  Dixon also stands as Maryland's all-time NCAA Tournament scoring leader with 294.  Upon completion of his career, Dixon's #3 jersey was honored and now hangs in the Xfinity Center.  In 2002, Juan Dixon was honored as a part of the ACC 50th Anniversary men's basketball team, one of only 8 Terrapins selected to the 50-man team. After his senior season, Dixon was featured on the cover of a video game, NCAA Final Four 2003.

NBA

Dixon was drafted 17th overall by the Washington Wizards in the 2002 NBA draft. He spent the first three years of his NBA career with the Wizards. In his third season in Washington (2004–05), he averaged eight points per game, including a career-high 35 points in Game 4 of the Eastern Conference Quarterfinals against the Chicago Bulls. Dixon signed as a free agent with the Portland Trail Blazers during the summer of 2005. Soon after, his Wizards and Terrapins teammate and friend Steve Blake signed with Portland as well. In his first game back in D.C., Dixon was given a standing ovation from the Verizon Center crowd upon coming off the bench towards the end of the first quarter. In Dixon's first year with the Blazers, he started 42 times and played in 76 games. In his last year with the Wizards, he only started four games and played in 63. He also increased his, assists, and shooting percentage considerably in Portland. However, he was later traded at the 2007 NBA trade deadline to Toronto for Fred Jones and future considerations.

On the 2008 NBA trade deadline, February 21, 2008, Dixon was traded from the Toronto Raptors to the Detroit Pistons in exchange for center Primož Brezec and cash considerations.

On September 24, 2008, the Washington Wizards signed Dixon to a partially guaranteed one-year deal for $1.03 million, the veterans' minimum for a player with Dixon's experience.

Dixon's final NBA game was on April 15, 2009, in a 107–115 loss to the Boston Celtics where he recorded 3 points, 1 rebound, 2 assists and 2 steals. On September 28, 2009, Juan Dixon signed a contract with the Atlanta Hawks. He was waived October 20, 2009.

Europe
On November 1, 2009, Dixon signed with Aris Thessaloniki of the Greek A1 League. The next season, he joined Unicaja Málaga of Spain. In February 2010, he was suspended indefinitely by FIBA after testing positive for steroids. In March 2011, he signed with Bandırma Banvit in Turkey. He played one season before entering the coaching profession.

Coaching career

On November 27, 2013, Dixon joined the Maryland Terrapin coaching staff as a special assistant under head coach Mark Turgeon. In July 2016, Dixon was relieved of his duties.

On October 14, 2016. Dixon was hired as head coach of the women's basketball team at the University of the District of Columbia (UDC). After a 3–25 season, he was hired as men's head coach at Coppin State.

Head coaching record

Women's

Men's

Career statistics

College

NBA

Regular season 

|-
| style="text-align:left;"| 
| style="text-align:left;"| Washington
| 42 || 3 || 15.4 || .384 || .298 || .804 || 1.7 || 1.0 || .6 || .1 || 6.4
|-
| style="text-align:left;"| 
| style="text-align:left;"| Washington
| 71 || 16 || 20.8 || .388 || .298 || .799 || 2.1 || 1.9 || 1.2 || .1 || 9.4
|-
| style="text-align:left;"| 
| style="text-align:left;"| Washington
| 63 || 4 || 16.7 || .416 || .327 || .897 || 1.9 || 1.8 || .7 || .1 || 8.0
|-
| style="text-align:left;"| 
| style="text-align:left;"| Portland
| 76 || 42 || 25.3 || .435 || .382 || .804 || 2.3 || 2.0 || .8 || .1 || 12.3
|-
| style="text-align:left;"| 
| style="text-align:left;"| Portland
| 55 || 1 || 22.6 || .426 || .364 || .833 || 1.5 || 1.5 || .9 || .1 || 8.9
|-
| style="text-align:left;"| 
| style="text-align:left;"| Toronto
| 26 || 5 || 26.3 || .425 || .325 || .932 || 2.8 || 1.6 || 1.0 || .1 || 11.1
|-
| style="text-align:left;"| 
| style="text-align:left;"| Toronto
| 36 || 0 || 11.8 || .369 || .436 || .947 || 1.3 || 1.8 || .6 || .1 || 4.3
|-
| style="text-align:left;"| 
| style="text-align:left;"| Detroit
| 17 || 0 || 14.4 || .480 || .394 || .429 || 1.6 || 1.9 || .0 || .0 || 6.5
|-
| style="text-align:left;"| 
| style="text-align:left;"| Washington
| 50 || 6 || 16.3 || .395 || .333 || .872 || 1.3 || 2.4 || .7 || .1 || 5.2
|- class="sortbottom"
| style="text-align:center;" colspan="2"| Career
| 436 || 77 || 19.5 || .413 || .341 || .833 || 1.9 || 1.8 || .8 || .1 || 8.4

Playoffs 

|-
| style="text-align:left;"| 2005
| style="text-align:left;"| Washington
| 10 || 0 || 21.9 || .406 || .324 || .840 || 2.6 || 1.3 || .7 || .0 || 11.4
|-
| style="text-align:left;"| 2007
| style="text-align:left;"| Toronto
| 6 || 0 || 10.5 || .381 || .250 || .000 || .7 || .5 || 1.2 || .0 || 3.0
|-
| style="text-align:left;"| 2008
| style="text-align:left;"| Detroit
| 2 || 0 || 3.5 || .000 || .000 || .000 || .0 || .0 || .0 || .0 || .0
|- class="sortbottom"
| style="text-align:center;" colspan="2"| Career
| 18 || 0 || 16.1 || .395 || .310 || .840 || 1.7 || .9 || .8 || .0 || 7.3

See also
 List of NCAA Division I men's basketball career steals leaders

References

External links

 
 Eurocup Profile
 Terrapinstats.com - Juan Dixon College Profile

1978 births
Living people
20th-century African-American sportspeople
21st-century African-American sportspeople
African-American basketball players
All-American college men's basketball players
American expatriate basketball people in Canada
American expatriate basketball people in Greece
American expatriate basketball people in Italy
American expatriate basketball people in Spain
American expatriate basketball people in Turkey
American men's basketball players
Aris B.C. players
Baloncesto Málaga players
Bandırma B.İ.K. players
Basketball coaches from Maryland
Basketball players from Baltimore
Calvert Hall College High School alumni
College men's basketball head coaches in the United States
Coppin State Eagles men's basketball coaches
Detroit Pistons players
Liga ACB players
Maryland Terrapins men's basketball players
Medalists at the 2001 Summer Universiade
Portland Trail Blazers players
Shooting guards
Sportspeople from Baltimore
Toronto Raptors players
Universiade bronze medalists for the United States
Universiade medalists in basketball
Washington Wizards draft picks
Washington Wizards players